Derek Gorst (1903-1981) was a British actor.

Selected filmography
 Once a Thief (1935)
 Lucky Days (1935)
 Lucky Jade (1937)
 The Fatal Hour (1937)
 The Singing Cop (1938)
 The Gables Mystery (1938)
 Incident in Shanghai (1938)
 His Lordship Regrets (1938)
 The Mind of Mr. Reeder (1939)
 Read All About It (1945)
 Beware of Pity (1946)

References

External links

1903 births
1981 deaths
British male film actors
Male actors from London
20th-century British male actors